The 2015 Swiss Indoors was a men's tennis tournament played on indoor hard courts. It was the 46th edition of the event, and part of the 500 series of the 2015 ATP World Tour. It was held at the St. Jakobshalle in Basel, Switzerland, from 26 October through 1 November 2015. First-seeded Roger Federer won the singles title.

Points and prize money

Point distribution

Prize money

Singles main-draw entrants

Seeds

 Rankings are as of October 19, 2015

Other entrants
The following players received wildcards into the singles main draw:
  Marco Chiudinelli
  Henri Laaksonen

The following players received entry from the qualifying draw:
  Robin Haase
  Jerzy Janowicz
  Dušan Lajović
  Adrian Mannarino

The following player received entry as a lucky loser:
  Denis Kudla

Withdrawals
Before the tournament
  Marcos Baghdatis (groin injury)→replaced by Denis Kudla
  Julien Benneteau →replaced by Borna Ćorić
  Kei Nishikori →replaced by Jiří Veselý
  Milos Raonic →replaced by Sergiy Stakhovsky
  Gilles Simon →replaced by Donald Young

Retirements
 Alexandr Dolgopolov (right elbow injury)

Doubles main-draw entrants

Seeds

 Rankings are as of October 19, 2015

Other entrants
The following pairs received wildcards into the doubles main draw:
  Adrien Bossel /  Marco Chiudinelli
  Henri Laaksonen /  Luca Margaroli

The following pair received entry from the qualifying draw:
  Treat Huey /  Henri Kontinen

The following pair received entry as lucky losers: 
 Robin Haase /  Sergiy Stakhovsky

Withdrawals
 Marcelo Melo (left leg injury)

Finals

Singles

 Roger Federer defeated  Rafael Nadal 6–3, 5–7, 6–3

Doubles

 Alexander Peya /  Bruno Soares defeated  Jamie Murray /  John Peers 7–5, 7–5

References

External links
Official website

2015 ATP World Tour
2015
2015 in Swiss tennis